Badian may refer to:

 Badian, Cebu, Philippines
 Ernst Badian (1925–2011), Austrian classical scholar
 Elyakim Badian (1923–2000), Israeli politician
 Maya Badian (born 1945), Romanian-born Canadian composer, musicologist, and professor
 Badian, a spice from Illicium verum tree